Ahmadwam is a town in the Federally Administered Tribal Areas of Pakistan. It is located at 32°32'21N 70°0'24E at an altitude of 1270 metres (4169 feet).

References

Populated places in Khyber Pakhtunkhwa